Atuagkat Bookstore (Greenlandic for "books") is Greenland's leading bookstore, located in the capital Nuuk. It is located at Aqqusinersuaq 4, opposite Hotel Hans Egede and Greenland Travel.

Atuagkat Bookstore is today one of two bookstores in Greenland, the other being in Ilulissat.

Atuagkat Bookstore (colloquially Atuagkat) has a wide range of books within, among other things, fiction, biographies and memoirs, children's literature, English literature for young people, in addition to the world's largest collection of Groenlandica within the bookstore industry, including an extensive antiquarian collection of Greenlandic publications. Atuagkat also has a wide range of games, posters, and maps of Greenland.

Atuagkat conducts trade locally in Nuuk, but also nationwide and internationally via their website, just as they accept inquiries by telephone, per email and via social media.

Atuagkat is particularly known for being one of the Danish Realm's coziest bookstores, and has a sofa arrangement with sofa, armchair and coffee table. There is coffee and tea in the pot for visitors every day, completely free.

Atuagkat was founded on 5 May 1966 and is Greenland's oldest bookstore.

1966-1986 
Atuagkat was founded by Det Grønlandske Forlag in 1966, with the aim that the profits from the book trade should cover the publisher's expenses for book publishing.

Bent Elkjær Danielsen was employed as leading bookseller, but already in 1968, he resigned. In the same year, Poul Bay was employed as the new bookseller, and he held the position until 1983.

In 1985, Inger Hauge was given the position of leading bookseller and the following year she took over from the publisher, and Atuagkat Boghandel thus became the first Home Rule-owned company to pass into private hands.

1986-2005 
Inger Hauge ran Atuagkat Bookstore together with her husband, Steen Amandus, who owned of Kontorteknik. The two companies were merged and run as Atuagkat & Kontorteknik until the turn of the millennium.

In 1991, Atuagkat was able to celebrate its 25th anniversary with an anniversary newspaper and with the performance of Dario Campeotto.

In the year 1999, it was decided to divide Atuagkat and Kontorteknik again. The office department remained at the address, now run by Cuno Møller Jensen, Lennie Pedersen, and Jens Raage as Kontorhuset. In the meantime, Atuagkat moved with the book department into the little blue house on Imaneq, which many today still remember Atuagkat as.

Inger Hauge founded Forlaget Atuagkat in 1994, which she ran herself until 2017, when she chose to stop taking in new books due to her advanced age. The last book she published was "The Porous Poet and the Snow Sparrow" by Hans-Erik Rasmussen.

2005-2015 
In 2005, Claus and Dorthe Jordening approached about a share in the business. This led to a real generational change, with the couple taking over the bookstore, while Inger kept Forlaget Atuagkat.

Claus and Dorthe continued to run Atuagkat in the blue house until 2010, when the house, due to the Greenland Government's plans to build a shopping center and offices for the Greenlandic government. Atuagkat temporarily moved into the old Kamik building not far from the original location.

Atuagkat had a home here until 2012, when the Nuuk Center was ready. Atuagkat Bookstore closed in May and reopened in July as Atuagkat Bog & Idé in Nuuk Center. The room they moved into is in almost the same place as the blue house.

In 2015, Atuagkat chose to move out of Nuuk Center again, and in the same connection they left the chain Bog & Idé, and thus became Atuagkat Bookstore again. They moved into Aqqusinersuaq 4, where they still have their business today.

2015 – 
Atuagkat was able to celebrate its 50th anniversary in 2016, with a large sale and reception in the store's premises. Proprietor Claus Jordening celebrated his 50th birthday that same year, so it was a double celebration on 6 May, the day after the business's anniversary.

References 

Bookstores in Greenland
Companies based in Nuuk
Independent bookstores
Buildings and structures in Nuuk
Retail companies established in 1976
1976 establishments in Greenland
Bookstores established in the 20th century